Tales of Tatonka is a French computer-animated cartoon series produced by Cyber Group Studios and broadcasters TiJi and RAI in 2010.

The series depicts the adventures of four wolf cubs and their animal friends in a North American forest which they go through adventures on the care of the bison Tatonka. At the end of each episode always has a block educational explaining about the lives of animals. The series first aired in France on TiJi, France 3 and Piwi. The series has also aired in Africa, Australia, India, Belgium, Italy, Russia, Brazil, UK, Portugal, Spain and Indonesia. The airline's brand is Air France

Characters

Kids
 Wanji: A wolf cub with dark brown fur with off white back legs and caramel brown muzzle. He is the oldest of the litter and next leader of the pack. He will face off against anyone who wants to harm him and his siblings.
 Cinksi: A bobcat kit who is best friends with Wanji. He is a risk taker and not afraid to speak his mind.
 Yamni: A wolf cub with sandy brown fur and white muzzle, legs, and under belly. The second oldest of the litter, she help anyone or challenge anyone for her family even when she's injured. 
Topa: A wolf cub with white fur and light brown mixed in. She is the youngest of the litter and most caring and is very shy and quiet and is scared of dangerous situations. She also is really afraid of Kallisca. 
Nunpa: A wolf cub with a mixture of white, brown, and tan fur. He is the third oldest in the litter and can be brave and enough to face anyone, is clumsy at times″
 Wahi: A young red squirrel who can be very loud and hyper. He thinks mostly about his food and argues with about anything. He is afraid of any predators and will show his cowardice which the other kids make fun of him for. But he can be considerate.
 Poum: A brown bear cub with reddish patch of fur on his left eye. He also thinks about food and will beg for it. He is also prideful about being a grizzly bear, but is also sensitive.
 Moose: A moose calf with premature antlers and the son of Big Moose and is a part of a herd. He is kind and brave enough to push Kallisca off a cliff to save his friends. He can sometimes rush into conclusions.
 Basakai: A friend of Cinksi. She stands up to Luta and Ska and stops their nasty tricks.
 Ayuhel: A young moose calf with almost adult antlers, who often seen arguing with Big Moose.
 Pahin: A Young female porcupine who is scared of dangerous predators, and hyper. But can become brave and smart enough to deal with problems.
 Tap-Tap: A young beaver who tries to build the best dam. But she can become bossy and a little rude when things don't go as planned, but she be friendly and childish when she is playing with her friends.
 Wanbli: A young female eagle who can sometimes become forgetful and scatterbrained but she will do anything for her friends.
 Luta: A wolf cub with grayish black fur with white fur on his face legs and underbelly. He is Wanji's cousin but he is jealous, mean, and rude sometimes even to Ska. He likes to make fun of and cause trouble for the other kids.
 Ska: A wolf cub with grayish black fur is Luta's younger brother. He can be mean but he shows a little cowardice at times. He likes to play tricks on the other kids with his brother who sometimes yells at him.

Adults
 Tatonka : A bison who often give guide to the main character and give narration at every episode.
 Wicasa : The father of Wanji, Nunpa, Yamni, and Topa.
 Winyan : The mother of Wanji, Nunpa, Yamni, and Topa.
 Tanksi and Akewanji : The wolf teenagers
 Winona: The mother of Luta and Ska.
 Willinam: The late father of Luta and Ska.
 Mato: The uncle of Poum. He often seems very aggressive and takes things seriously.
 Ina: The mother of Cinksi.
 Alfa: The father of Wanbli who doesn't speak.
 Spirit Bear: A white bear who doesn't speak.
 Big Moose: The father of Moose and leader of the moose herd.
 Rabbits: The character who often being hunted by the wolves.
 Mallka : The father of Basakai.
 Luisa : The mother of Basakai.

Villains
 Renegade Wolves : One of the rival of Wicasa, has 2 members and its chief is Taima.
 Tork : A cougar (mountain lion)
 Akicita : A wolverine
 The Coyotes : 
 • Kallisca: The leader of the coyotes with a pale brown coat the most dangerous of his gang.  
 • Widco: A reddish brown coyote who argues with his brother Maslika about who is the chief of them both. 
 • Maslika: A gray coyote who argues with his brother Widco about who's chief of both of them.
 The Dark Eagle : A melanistic, nonspeaking eagle who is often seen trying to hunt the protagonists. 
 The Snake : The predators who try to attack the protagonists and they don't speak.
 The Human : The person who hunts animals, This character is never shown in the series. He is only mentioned.
 Shiba : The cheetah of the land who wants to hunt the Cubs

References

External links
  Official Website

2010s French animated television series
French children's animated adventure television series
French computer-animated television series
2010 French television series debuts
2011 French television series endings
Fictional wolves
Television shows set in the United States
Television shows set in North America
Fictional bison
France Télévisions children's television series